The 2000 Copa del Rey Juvenil was the 50th staging of the tournament. The competition began on 14 May 2000 and ended with the final on 25 June 2000.

Qualified teams

Group I: Valladolid, Sporting de Gijón, Racing de Santander.
Group II: Zaragoza, Athletic Bilbao, Real Sociedad.
Group III: FC Barcelona, Mallorca, Espanyol.
Group IV: Sevilla, Málaga, Cádiz.
Group V: Real Madrid, Atlético Madrid, Rayo Vallecano.
Group VI: Huracán.

First round

|}

Quarterfinals

|}

Semifinals

|}

Final

Copa del Rey Juvenil de Fútbol
Juvenil